USS Peterhoff was a British ship captured by the Union Navy during the American Civil War. Condemned as a blockade runner, she served the Union Navy's struggle against the Confederate States of America as a gunboat.

Ship history

Construction
The Peterhoff was a 416-ton iron-hulled yacht originally built for the Tsar of Russia by C. J. Mare & Co. of Blackwall, London, with 140 hp steam engines by J & G. Rennie. Launched in 1850,

Early history
During her delivery voyage to Saint Petersburg, Peterhoff was driven ashore on Saaremaa on 1 November 1850. She was abandoned by the crew and her insurers made a payment of £15,000 to the Imperial Russian Government. She was later refloated and sank to preserve her from damage from the waves. Peterhoff was refloated in the spring of 1851 and taken in to Riga, where temporary repairs were made. Departing in early July, she reached London on 17 July. The ship was acquired by British interests and fitted out as a cargo ship.

Seizure
Peterhoff sailed from Falmouth, Cornwall on 27 January 1863. Alabama found her papers in order and released her. Peterhoff then entered the harbour at St. Thomas where two U.S. Navy ships commanded by Acting Rear Admiral Charles Wilkes were at anchor. Wilkes, already notorious for his part in the "Trent Affair", ordered that the Peterhoff be boarded by the  just after she had left harbour on 25 February.

Peterhoff had papers that stated that she was bound for Matamoros in Mexico, but then a sailor aboard let slip that she was really bound for Brownsville, Texas, just across the Rio Grande. This comment was taken as sufficient justification for Vanderbilt to seize the ship as a blockade runner, and she was sent to Key West. Both the Danish and British governments vigorously protested the seizure, but the ship was eventually condemned by the New York prize court and bought by the Union Navy. 
She was commissioned in February 1864 with Acting-Volunteer Lieutenant Thomas Pickering in command, and assigned to the North Atlantic Blockading Squadron.

Sinking
The ship departed Hampton Roads, Virginia, on 28 February to blockade Wilmington, North Carolina. However, early on the morning of 6 March 1864, the Peterhoff was rammed by the gunboat  who mistook her for a blockade runner. Although Peterhoff sank within half an hour, all of her crew were saved.

Post-war
After the Civil War, the Supreme Court overturned the prize court's decision, and the owners of the Peterhoff received compensation for their loss.

Three 32-pounder smoothbore cannon were later salvaged. In 1974, a 30-pounder Parrott rifle was raised, and is now on display at the University of North Carolina Wilmington. Other guns from the ship are on display at Fort Fisher State Historic Site and the Carteret County Museum of History at Morehead City, North Carolina. The wreck site was placed on the National Register of Historic Places in 1975.

See also

Blockade runners of the American Civil War
Blockade mail of the Confederacy

References

External links
  72 U.S. 28 -The Peterhoff United States Supreme Court ruling
 

1850 ships
Ships built on the River Thames
Steamships of Russia
Ships of the Imperial Russian Navy
Maritime incidents in November 1850
Merchant ships of the United Kingdom
Paddle steamers of the United Kingdom
Shipwrecks on the National Register of Historic Places in North Carolina
Ships of the Union Navy
Steamships of the United States Navy
Gunboats of the United States Navy
American Civil War patrol vessels of the United States
Shipwrecks of the American Civil War
Shipwrecks of the Carolina coast
Friendly fire incidents
Ships sunk in collisions
National Register of Historic Places in New Hanover County, North Carolina
Captured ships
Maritime incidents in March 1864